Wyoming Highway 330 (WYO 330) is a fairly short  east-west state highway in central Sheridan County, Wyoming, United States, that serves the northwestern part of Sheridan.

Route description

WYO 330 starts its western end just west of Sheridan at Sheridan County Route 74 (Soldier Creek Road). WYO 330 heads east into Sheridan changing to West Fifth Street, and passes north of the Sheridan Country Club and Rotary Park before passing south of Sheridan Memorial Hospital half-way through its route. WYO 330 crosses Big Goose Creek before ending at an intersection with I-90 Business/US 14 Business/US 87 Business (N. Main Street) and the western terminus of Wyoming Highway 336 (E. Fifth Street).

History
WYO 330 was originally designated in Sweetwater and Carbon counties on the routing of present-day WYO 789 between Creston Junction and Baggs before the multi-state US 789 was implemented (and subsequently retracted).

Major intersections

See also

 List of state highways in Wyoming

References

External links

 Wyoming State Routes 300-399
 Wyoming Highway 330 - I-90 Bus/US-87/US-14 Bus/WYO 336 to Sheridan CR 74

Transportation in Sheridan County, Wyoming
330
Sheridan, Wyoming